Weiyang District is one of 11 urban districts of the prefecture-level city of Xi'an, the capital of Shaanxi Province, Northwest China. It is located at northwest Xi'an, functioning as the new administrative centre of the city. The district borders Baqiao District to the east, the city of Xianyang to the west, Xincheng District and Lianhu District to the north, as well as Yanta District and Changan District to the southwest. The geographical coordinates are 34°14'50''N ~ 34°26'22''N, 108°47'08''E ~ 109°02'21''E, and the total area is 264.41 square kilometers. By November 11, 2020, the total population of permanent residents in the district is 733,403, taking up around 5.66% of the city's population.

Weiyang District had significant historical importance. It is named after the ruins of Weiyang Palace of Han Dynasty which is located inside the district, meaning "the prosperity never ends" (simplified Chinese: "繁荣兴盛，不尽不衰"). It is also the origin of the Silk Road. 11 ancient dynasties built their capitals inside the modern time Weiyang District, including Qin, Western Han, Eastern Han, Western Wei, Northern Zhou, etc. Among the many historical relics located in this district, Site of Epang Palace, Site of Daming Palace, and Han Chang'an City Site were listed in the first batch of Chinese national key cultural relics protection sites in 1961 by the State Council of the People's Republic of China.

Administrative divisions

Subdistricts 
As 2021, Weiyang District contains 10 subdistricts.

Natural Geography

Climate 
Weiyang District, together with the city of Xi'an, has a humid continental climate. The weather performances of the four seasons are distinct, and the annual rainfall intensity is moderate.

Seasons 
In spring, the temperature rises rapidly but is often accompanied by fluctuation. The rainfall in spring takes up 1/4 of the annual level. The summer here is hot with heavy rainfall. Weather of extreme heat with over  exists every year. The rainfall in summer takes up around 37% of the annual level. Following summer, the temperature drops rapidly in autumn. The rainfall in autumn takes up around 19% of the annual level. Autumn has the gentlest wind in the whole year. Winter weather is cold with little rain or snow. The lowest temperature in winter could fall below . Winter is dry with rainfall or snow taking up only 4% of the annual precipitation.

Wind 
Winds in Weiyang District are mostly northeast winds, next southwest winds.

Hydrology 
Weiyang District has the largest water system and the biggest water area in Xi'an. All the rivers in Weiyang District are branches from the Yellow River. The Wei River (渭河) runs through the north of the district, the Ba River (灞河) runs through the east side, the Chan River (浐河) runs through the east, and the Zao River (皂河) runs through the west.

Tourist Attractions

Historical Relics

Site of Epang Palace 
The site of Epang Palace is ruins left from the very first power-centralized dynasty – Qin Dynasty. The Epang Palace, together with the Great Wall, the Mausoleum of the First Qin Emperor (the Terracotta Army), and the Expressway of Qin, is marked as "Qin Shi Huang's Four Major Projects". The building process of the palace was started in 212 B.C.. However, after five years of construction, the palace was left unfinished due to the sudden downfall of the Qin Dynasty in 206 B.C.. This site was listed in the first batch of Chinese national key cultural relics protection sites in 1961 by the State Council of the People's Republic of China. The ruins of the palace was deemed by UNESCO in 1992 to be ranked first in the world's palace buildings and belongs to the Wonders of the World. The ancient Chinese ode to the Epang Palace (阿房宫赋) also narrates the story of this historical relic.

Site of Daming Palace 
The site of Daming Palace is mostly located in Weiyang district with a small part extending into the Xincheng District. It is the ruins of the largest palace in the capital city Chang'an of Tang Dynasty. According to archaeological researches, the palace had a trapezoidal flat plan: the east palace wall has  in length, the west wall has , the south wall has , and the north wall has . It was listed in the first batch of Chinese national key cultural relics protection sites in 1961 by the State Council of the People's Republic of China. The ruins was reconstructed into a National Heritage Park in 2010. At Jun 22nd, 2014, the site of Daming Palace was added into the World Heritage List.

Han Chang'an City Site 
The site of Han Dynasty's capital Chang'an is one of the Chinese ancient capital sites that has the largest size, the most complete preservation, the most abundant ruins, and significant historical importance. In 200 B.C., the Changle Palace finished reconstruction. In 199 B.C., the Weiyang Palace was built to its initial size. From 194 B.C. to 190 B.C., the city wall was constructed. The whole site has the area of 18,533 acres (75 square kilometers). It was listed among the first batch of Chinese national key cultural relics protection sites in 1961 by the State Council of the People's Republic of China.

The Site of Weiyang Palace 
The site of Weiyang Palace of Han Dynasty was built around 200 B.C. It contains more than 40 halls and functioned as the administrative center in the later 11 dynasties after Han for more than 360 years. The Weiyang Palace has the longest existence among all the palaces in ancient Chinese history. It was listed among the first batch of Chinese national key cultural relics protection sites in 1961 and was included in the World Heritage List in 2014.

Museums

Han Chang'an City Relics Exhibition Museum 
This exhibition hall is the first dedicated museum for the complete introduction of Han Chang'an City and its relics. It was first opened to publics at Jun 13th, 2009. The 2 sub-exhibition halls in the museum are theme differently. The first hall introduces Chang'an City's historical evolution, layout scale, cultural style, and the current site's preservation status, archaeological achievements, and the remains from Han Dynasty. The second hall is dedicated to introduce the Silk Road since Chang'an was the starting point of the ancient Silk Road.

Other Muesums 

 Xi'an Meidu Museum: a private museum for the Shaanxi Province's central-collection and exhibition of the export porcelain and the enamel wares in Ming and Qing Dynasties. 
 Yu Youren Calligraphy Art Museum: a folk museum for the collection and the exhibition of the calligraphy works by the artist Yu Youren. 
 Xi'an Royal Art Museum: a large folk museum for the collection and the exhibition of the art treasures from the royal families of different dynasties. 
 Xi'an Jingwen Ox Culture Ceramics Museum: the only ox-related museum in China. Collection includes different ox-related ceramics artworks from the 13 dynasties that have based their capitals at Xi'an. 
 Snowflake Beer Museum: a corporation-funded museum dedicated to introduce the historical evolution of beer in China, the brewing technology development, and the beer appreciation methods. 
 Xi'an Yaguan Porcelain Art Museum: a private museum dedicated to the exhibition and the study of the contemporary porcelain arts.

Scenic Sites and Parks 

 Han City Lake National Water Conservancy Scenic Area
 Wiyang Lake Amusement Park
 Xi'an City Athletic Park 
 Chan-Ba National Wetland Park
 Xi'an Wei River Ecological Landscape Scenic Area

Transportation

Expressways 

 Xibao Expressway (西宝高速)
 Xitong Expressway (西铜高速)
 Xiyan Expressway(西阎高速)
 Xitong Expressway (西潼高速)
 Xi'an City Ring Expressway (西安绕城高速)
 Airport Expressway Line 1 (机场高速一号线)
 Airport Expressway Line 2 (机场高速二号线)

Metro Lines 

 Xi'an Metro Line 1
 Xi'an Metro Line 2
 Xi'an Metro Line 3
 Xi'an Metro Line 4

Airport

Xi'an Xianyang International Airport (XIY) 
Weiyang District is only 8 kilometers away from Xi'an Xianyang International Airport. This airport is one of the eight largest regional hub airports in Mainland China. The airport was officially competed and opened to traffic on September 1, 1991. On September 18, 2003, the second terminal (T2) was put into use. It was then the largest in scale and the most modernized airport in northwest China. On May 3, 2012, the third terminal (T3) was finished and opened to traffic. Meanwhile, after being used for 21 years, the oldest terminal (T1) was shut down.

Railroads

Xi'anbei Railway Station 
Xi'anbei Railway Station is located inside Weiyang district, right on the northern central axis of the city of Xi'an. It is one of the main railway stations in Xi'an. It is also the largest and the most important railway passenger station in the railway network of northwest China. Xi'anbei Railway Station was put into use at January 11, 2011. The total area of the station is around 83.5 acres (338,000 square meters), and the highest point of the station measures .

References

Districts of Xi'an